Sunny Side is a historic home located near Burlington, Alamance County, North Carolina. It was built in 1871, and is a two-story, "T"-shaped frame Italianate style dwelling with Gothic Revival style design elements. It features an ornate two-bay hip-roof front porch.  Also on the property are the contributing well house and smokehouse, and the remnants of the original gardens. It was built by Lawrence S. Holt, a prominent Alamance County textile mill owner and philanthropist.

It was added to the National Register of Historic Places in 1987.

References

Houses on the National Register of Historic Places in North Carolina
Gothic Revival architecture in North Carolina
Italianate architecture in North Carolina
Houses completed in 1871
Houses in Alamance County, North Carolina
National Register of Historic Places in Alamance County, North Carolina